Children's Grand Park is a park complex in Gwangjin-gu, Seoul, South Korea. Facilities at Children's Grand Park include hills and hiking trails, Zoo, garden, and an amusement park. Situated in Seoul City's Gwangjin-gu, Children's Grand Park is a leisure facility for families, offering a botanical garden, amusement facilities, and diverse performance events. Opened on a Korean holiday called Children's Day in 1973, the park is full of attractions that appeal to youngsters: Marine Animal House that exhibits seals and polar bears, a Small Animal Village, and even a Parrot Village. Nearly 62% of the park's total area of about  consists of trees and grass and various facilities.

Background history 
Seoul Children's Grand Park is an eco-friendly park. It obtained ISO 14001 certification and was designated as an educational experiencing place by Seoul Metropolitan Office of Education for operating various educational programs for children. Seoul Children's Grand Park was originally the royal tomb for Myeong Seong Hwang Hu, who was the Queen of the last King, Sunjong, of the Greater Korean Empire. In 1926, the tomb was moved to Yangju-gun (currently Namyangju City) in Gyeongi Province when King Sunjong died. In 1970, by order of President Park Chung-hee, construction of the park started and opened the following year.

In April 2021, the park reopened to the public following eight months of renovation.  The park now features 14 rides including a roller coaster, a Viking ship ride, a merry-go-round and bumper cars.  The zoo is inhabited by 90 animal species and provides several educational programs that promote the importance of nature and wildlife conservation.

Service hours 
Between 5 a.m. ~ 10 p.m. (05:00 ~ 22:00)

Opening time of the main entrance, rear gate, Guuimun, and Neungdongmun (05:00 ~ 22:00)
		
The zoo is open from 9 a.m. ~ 5 p.m. (It is subject to change depending on season and weather.)

Fee information

Entrance is free, but fees for facilities such as the zoo and amusement park vary according to facility.
 Free admission of park entrance
 Fee charged or the use of Park Facilities

Animal show

Operation 
Year-round

Time 
April ~ October → 11:30 ~ 17:00 on weekdays (every hour) / 11:30 ~ 18:00 on weekends (every hour)
November ~ March → 11:30 ~ 16:00 on weekdays (every hour) / 11:30 ~ 17:00 on weekends (every hour)

Note (contact info.) 
For senior citizen and patriot/veteran: Fee for child.
The handicapped (including group) 5,000 won for adult / 4,000 won for teenager and child.
Event time is subject to change.
Admission fee for adults older than 19 year-old

Fee for the use of park facilities

Information of facilities

Parking facilities 
Main entrance parking lot: 153 parking spaces
Rear entrance parking lot: 252 parking spaces
Guuimun entrance parking lot: 315 parking spaces

Location 
Address: 216, Neungdong-ro, Gwangjin-gu, Seoul, Korea (Neung-dong)

Public transportation
  Achasan station
  Children's Grand Park station
 Bus: 130, 302, 303, 320, 370, 721, 2221, 2311, 3216, 4212, 9403, 3500, 9301, 119

See also
 Everland
 Seoul Land
 Lotte World

References 

Kidsfuninseoul. (n.d.). "Children's Grand Park Seoul." Retrieved from  https://kidsfuninseoul.wordpress.com/playing/amusement-parks/childrens-grand-park/
Lee, H. S. (2015). Measurement of visitors' satisfaction with public zoos in Korea using importance-performance analysis.Tourism Management, 47- 251–260. doi: 10.1016/j.tourman.2014.10.006
LifeinKorea. (2015). "Seoul Children's Grand Park." Retrieved from https://web.archive.org/web/20150506012905/http://www.lifeinkorea.com/Travel2/454
Nam, J., & Kim, H. (n.d). The Correlation Between Spatial Characteristics and Utilization of City Parks: A Focus on Neighborhood Parks in Seoul, Korea. Journal of Asian Architecture and Building Engineering, 13(2), 515–522.
Seoul Metropolitan Facilities Management. (2015). "Children's Grand Park." Retrieved from http://new.sisul.or.kr/global/main/en/sub/park.jsp
Korea Tourism Organization. (n.d.). "Children's Grand Park." Retrieved from http://english.visitkorea.or.kr/enu/SI/SI_EN_3_1_1_1.jsp?cid=1051832

External links

Amusement parks in South Korea
Parks in Seoul
Gwangjin District
1973 establishments